Einstellung are a krautrock/shoegaze band from Birmingham, England.

Biography 
Einstellung formed in 2004. In 2006, their debut album, Wings Of Desire, was released on CD on Chatterbox Records. At the same time, "Sleep Easy Mr Parker", a 28-minute, one-track CD single was released on Bearos. Both releases and their loud, heavy shows garnered them much attention (the unusually long, trance-inducing, krautrocker "Sleep Easy Mr Parker" appeared on the BBC website).

In 2007, Einstellung presented 'Das Land Ohne Musik' a concert featuring acoustic versions of songs from their Wings of Desire album with strings and piano parts added by pianist and composer Rich Batsford.  A live album of the concert was released in early 2018.  Later in 2007, they participated in the Project X Presents event at the Rainbow Warehouse, Digbeth, including another collaboration with Rich Batsford which also featured Islamic vocal group Aashiq al-Rasul.

More recently Wings Of Desire was released on double-vinyl on Capsule Records and Einstellung now have their own label, Powerkrautrecords.

Einstellung's work has been likened to My Bloody Valentine ("Schwester" is probably the sort of thing people have been thinking of in the past when they’ve ventured similarities between Einstellung and My Bloody Valentine Bardo Pond and Neu! amongst others.

Band members
 Andrew Moscardo-Parker - Guitars
 Andrew Smart - Guitars
 Steve Hough - Bass
 Simon Rider - Drums

Projects and related 
 Andrew Moscardo Parker - Lash Frenzy, Sally (ex Katastrophy Wife)
 Andrew Smart - Mahakalpa, Sonic Waking
 Steve Hough - Torque, Lash Frenzy (ex Cable Regime, Godflesh, Grover, Krafla
 Simon Rider - Lash Frenzy (ex Grover,  Moneygods

References

External links 
 Einstellung Website
 Capsule Records
 Bearos Records

Musical groups established in 2004
Musical groups from Birmingham, West Midlands
English experimental rock groups
Musical quartets
British shoegaze musical groups
Krautrock musical groups